The Pioneer Mountains cover  in Beaverhead County in southwestern Montana, USA.

The highest peaks in this range include:

 Tweedy Mountain
 Torrey Mountain
 Baldy Mountain
 Mount Fleecer
 Odell Mountain

The Pioneer Mountains are divided into two subranges by the paved Wise River Road: the East Pioneers and West Pioneers. The highest mountains in the entire range are in the East Pioneers -  Tweedy Mountain and nearby Torrey Mountain,  these two peaks are the highest on the Beaverhead National Forest.

The two subranges are quite different from each other in appearance. The East Pioneers have rugged, heavily glaciated peaks. About  of the East Pioneers are roadless, and the range holds more than 30 high lakes, including Grayling Lake, which contains Arctic grayling. Golden trout are present in Sawtooth and Hidden Lakes. Mountain goats inhabit the high crags of the range, while pronghorn utilize the lower elevation grassland foothills. The East Pioneers receive relatively little use from recreationists, and a number of lake basins are trailless.

In marked contrast to the East Pioneers, the West Pioneers are gently rolling, heavily forested mountains. The highest point in the West Pioneers is Stine Mountain, el. 9,497 ft.  of the West Pioneers are a Wilderness Study Area.

Lakes in the West Pioneers contain perhaps the last pure strain population of Arctic grayling south of Canada. Old growth whitebark pine and lodgepole pine is present in the West Pioneers; a stand of lodgepole pine over 500 years old is reputed to be the oldest known anywhere.

Wolke describes the West Pioneers region as an ecological treasure.  Wildlife in the West Pioneers includes elk, black bear, moose, pine marten, wolverine, and northern goshawk.

A site on the Beaverhead National Forest just off the Wise River Road, called Crystal Park, is available for the public to dig for quartz crystals.

See also
 List of mountain ranges in Montana

References

External links
Article on Goingoutside.com.
Pioneer Mountains on Google Maps

Mountain ranges of Montana
Landforms of Beaverhead County, Montana
Beaverhead-Deerlodge National Forest